The Ladies English Open was a women's professional golf tournament on the Ladies European Tour. It was first held between 1991 and 1996, when it was dominated by Laura Davies who won four of the five tournaments played. It was re-established in 2004 and held annually until 2008, during which time it was contested over three rounds, as opposed to four, and as such had one of the lowest prize funds on the tour.

Winners

External links

LET information centre - full results for the Ladies English Open

English Open
Golf tournaments in England
Recurring sporting events established in 1991
Recurring sporting events disestablished in 2008
Defunct sports competitions in England